Eudora is a city in Chicot County, Arkansas, United States. The population was 2,269 at the 2010 census, down from 2,819 in 2000.

Geography
Eudora is located in southern Chicot County at  (33.114608, -91.262653). U.S. Route 65 passes through the city, leading north  to Lake Village, the Chicot County seat, northeast (via U.S. Route 82)  to Greenville, Mississippi, and south  to Lake Providence, Louisiana.

Demographics

2020 census

As of the 2020 United States Census, there were 1,728 people, 886 households, and 587 families residing in the city.

2010 census
As of the 2010 United States Census, there were 2,269 people living in the city. The racial makeup of the city was 89.3% Black, 9.1% White, 0.4% Native American, <0.1% Asian and 0.2% from two or more races. 1.0% were Hispanic or Latino of any race.

2000 census
As of the census of 2000, there were 2,819 people, 1,047 households, and 731 families living in the city. The racial makeup of the city was 13.94% White, 84.50% Black or African American, 0.04% Native American, 0.18% Asian, 0.46% from other races, and 0.89% from two or more races.  1.38% of the population were Hispanic or Latino of any race.

There were 1,047 households, out of which 34.9% had children under the age of 18 living with them, 30.5% were married couples living together, 34.7% had a female householder with no husband present, and 30.1% were non-families. 26.6% of all households were made up of individuals, and 14.2% had someone living alone who was 65 years of age or older.  The average household size was 2.69 and the average family size was 3.24.

In the city, the population was spread out, with 32.4% under the age of 18, 9.4% from 18 to 24, 23.7% from 25 to 44, 20.0% from 45 to 64, and 14.6% who were 65 years of age or older.  The median age was 33 years. For every 100 females, there were 80.2 males. For every 100 females age 18 and over, there were 68.9 males. The median income for a household in the city was $17,857, and the median income for a family was $19,840. Males had a median income of $20,729 versus $15,262 for females. The per capita income for the city was $9,437.  About 34.6% of families and 36.5% of the population were below the poverty line, including 43.3% of those under age 18 and 30.0% of those age 65 or over.

Eudora has one grocery store, two dollar stores, and a factory that is the county's largest employer.

Climate
The climate in this area is characterized by hot, humid summers and mild winters. Eudora has a humid subtropical climate (Köppen 'Cfa', Trewartha 'Cf'). Temperature extremes since 1962 have ranged from 3 °F (-16 °C) in December 1989 to 108 °F (42 °C) in August 2011. More typically, a year will range from 17 °F (-8 °C) to 102 °F (39 °C).

Eudora is the warmest populated area in Arkansas.

Culture
In 1970 Tony Joe White released a song on his self-titled album entitled "They Caught the Devil and Put Him in Jail in Eudora, Arkansas."

Education
The Lakeside School District operates public schools. On February 13, 2006, the Eudora School District consolidated into the Lakeside district.

Notable people
 Charley Barnes - NFL end, born in Eudora
 Frank Burgess - U.S. Federal Judge, United States District Court for the Western District of Washington, born in Eudora
 Camille Keaton - actress
 Cliff Powell Jr. - University of Arkansas LB, First Team All-American, Razorbacks 1960s All-Decade Team, Razorbacks All-Century Team, University of Arkansas Sports Hall of Fame, Arkansas Hall of Fame, Southwest Conference Hall of Fame

See also
 List of cities and towns in Arkansas

References

External links

 City of Eudora official website

 
Cities in Chicot County, Arkansas
Cities in Arkansas